Saclay is a commune in the southwestern suburbs of Paris, France. It had a population of 3,067 in 2006. It is best known for the large scientific facility CEA Saclay, mostly dealing with nuclear and particle physics. Inhabitants of Saclay are known as Saclaysiens.

Transport
Saclay is served by no station of the Paris Métro (RER), or suburban rail network. The closest station to Saclay is Le Guichet station on Paris RER line B. This station is located in the neighboring commune of Orsay,  to the south of the town center of Saclay.

See also
Communes of the Essonne department
Plateau de Saclay

References

External links

Official website 
Community blog 

Mayors of Essonne Association 

1846 establishments in France
Communes of Essonne